A list of animated television series first aired in 2000.

See also
 List of animated feature films of 2000
 List of Japanese animation television series of 2000

References

Animated series
2000
2000
2000-related lists